Public Enemies is a 1941 American comedy film directed by Albert S. Rogell and written by Edward T. Lowe Jr. and Lawrence Kimble. The film stars Wendy Barrie, Phillip Terry, Edgar Kennedy, William Frawley, Marc Lawrence and Nana Bryant. The film was released on October 30, 1941, by Republic Pictures.

Plot
An ex-reporter and the socialite who caused him to lose his job become embroiled in a crime organisation's operations.

Cast 
Wendy Barrie as Bonnie Parker
Phillip Terry as Bill Raymond
Edgar Kennedy as Biff
William Frawley as Bang
Marc Lawrence as Mike
Nana Bryant as Emma
Willie Fung as Lee Hong
Paul Fix as Scat
Russell Hicks as Tregar
Tim Ryan as Trumbull
Duke York as Holmes
Ken Lundy as Lively
Peter Leeds as Reporter
Cyril Ring as Reporter
Eddie Fetherston as Reporter
Francis Sayles as Copy Man
Guy Usher as Detective Captain
Lee Phelps as Sergeant Operator
Charles McAvoy as Policeman
Rod Bacon as Tubby
Pat Gleason as Maxie
Dick Paxton as Bellboy
Chuck Morrison as Deliveryman
Jack Kenney as Deliveryman
Harry Holman as Fat Reporter
Frank Richards as Shelby
Sammy Stein as Jake
Francis Pierlot as Priest
Jerry Jerome as Duke
Wally Albright as Tommy
Sam Bernard as Karmourian
Sammy McKim as Newsboy
Robert Winkler as Newsboy
Douglas Deems as Newsboy
Larry Harris as Newsboy
Eddy Waller as Olaf
James C. Morton as Detective
Dick Rush as Detective
Arthur Housman as Drunk

References

External links
 

1941 films
1940s English-language films
American comedy films
1941 comedy films
Republic Pictures films
Films directed by Albert S. Rogell
American black-and-white films
1940s American films